Frederick is an unincorporated community in Schuyler County, Illinois, United States. Frederick has a post office with ZIP code 62639.

References

Unincorporated communities in Schuyler County, Illinois
Unincorporated communities in Illinois